Viljoen is an Afrikaans surname, derived from the French Villion. It was brought to South Africa in 1671 by French Huguenots who subsequently intermarried with the local Dutch population.
The progenitors of the extended Viljoen clan are François Villion (born Clermont, Île-de-France, France) and Cornelia Campenaar (born in Middelburg, Zeeland, Netherlands). Married in the Cape of Good Hope, they later farmed for a living near Stellenbosch. Some of their descendants include:

Annari Viljoen (born 1987), South African Olympic badminton player
Barend Viljoen (born 1908), South African military commander
Ben Viljoen (born 1869), South African military commander
Bronwyn Law-Viljoen, South African writer, editor, publisher and professor
Christi Viljoen (born 1987), Namibian cricketer
Christo Viljoen (born 1937). South African academic, engineer, genealogist
Colin Viljoen (born 1948), South African born former English international footballer
Dirk Viljoen (born 1977), former cricketer
Constand Viljoen (1933–2020), former South African military commander and politician
Gerrit Viljoen (born 1926), former South African government minister
Hardus Viljoen (born 1989), South African cricketer
Irene van Dyk, née Viljoen (born 1972), South African and New Zealand international netballer
Joggie Viljoen (born 1945), South African rugby union footballer 
Joggie Viljoen (born 1976), South African rugby union footballer 
Johannes Viljoen (1904–1976), South African Olympic track and field athlete
Jurie Viljoen (born 1942), Namibian politician
Ken Viljoen (1910–1974), South African cricketer and cricket manager
Lettie Viljoen, pseudonym of the South African author Ingrid Winterbach
Marais Viljoen (1915–2007), ceremonial State President of South Africa
Nik Viljoen, New Zealand international football (soccer) player
Sunette Viljoen (born 1983), South African javelin thrower
Willem Viljoen (born 1987), South African Olympic badminton player, brother of Annari

References 

Surnames of French origin
Afrikaans-language surnames